Iridomyrmex florissantius is an extinct species of ant in the subfamily Dolichoderinae. It was described by Frank M. Carpenter in 1930 after a fossil was found in the United States.

References

†
Fossil ant taxa
Hymenoptera of North America
Fossil taxa described in 1930
Taxa named by Frank M. Carpenter